The Ipao Pillbox I is one of three surviving World War II-era fortifications on Ypao Point, located west of Tumon Bay on the west side of the island of Guam. Its entrance is on the east wall, and its gun port faces north, overlooking Ypao Channel. Parts of the structure have been restored.

The structure was listed on the National Register of Historic Places in 1991.

See also
National Register of Historic Places listings in Guam

References

External links
 

Buildings and structures on the National Register of Historic Places in Guam
World War II on the National Register of Historic Places in Guam
1940s establishments in Guam
Tumon, Guam
Pillboxes (military)